The crafts of India are diverse, rich in history, culture 
and religion.  The craft of each state in India reflect the influence of different empires. Throughout centuries, crafts have been embedded as a culture and tradition within rural communities.

Crafts

Metal Crafts includes metal work using Zinc, Copper, Brass, Silver, Gold. Some of the traditional ancient handicraft styles are Bidriware, Pembarthi Metal Craft, Dhokra, Kamrupi

Bidriware The term 'Bidriware' originates from the township of Bidar, which is still the chief center for the manufacture of the unique metalware. Due to its striking inlay artwork, Bidriware is an important export handicraft of India and is prized as a symbol of wealth. The metal used is a blackened alloy of zinc and copper inlaid with thin sheets of pure silver.

Pembarthi Metal Craft Pembarthi Metal Craft is a metal handicraft made in Pembarthi, Warangal district, Telangana State, India. They are popular for their exquisite sheet metal art works. This meticulous brass work art flourished during the reign of Kakatiyas empire. Kakatiyas extensively used sheet metal art to adorn chariots and temples.

Dhokra is non<ref/ref>–ferrous metal casting using the lost-wax casting technique. This sort of metal casting has been used in India for over 4,000 years and is still used. One of the earliest known lost wax artefacts is the dancing girl of Mohenjo-daro.[1] The product of dhokra artisans are in great demand in domestic and foreign markets because of primitive simplicity, enchanting folk motifs and forceful form. Dhokra horses, elephants, peacocks, owls, religious images, measuring bowls, and lamp caskets etc., are highly appreciated.

Kamrupi Brass and Bell Metal products of Kamrup are famous for their beauty and strength of form and utility. Brass is an important cottage industry, with highest concentration in Hajo, while Sarthebari is well known for its bell metal craft. The principal items of brass are the kalah (water pot), sarai (a platter or tray mounted on a base), kahi (dish), bati (bowl), lota (water pot with a long neck) and tal (cymbals). Gold, silver and copper too have formed part of traditional metalcraft in Kamrup, and the State Museum in Guwahati has a rich collection of items made of these metals. Gold is generally used in ornaments.

Crafts of Bihar 
Bihar , recognised by its Madhubani/Mithila Painting, Being the birthplace of some of the most celebrated folk takes of India, it comes out quite naturally that the natives of Mithila have an innate quality to conceive a visually captivating narrative art form, to tell these tales with their due reverence. These visual narratives are known as Madhubani Paintings, literally meaning the ‘Forest of honey’. These are also one of the earliest forms of Indian paintings., Bhagalpur painting which is also known as Manjusha Art & extra ordinary delicacy of quilting.

Crafts of Rajasthan 

Rajasthan, recognised by its Royal heritage is a prominent and well-established craft industry. Craft remains a tradition in Rajasthan, preserved over centuries by the stronghold of the Royal Rajput family.   Within the craft industry are smaller occupations. These include, fabric colouration and embellishment, decorative painting and puppetry. Craft workers see this not as an occupation, but rather a mark of respect to their heritage. In the process of fabric colouration, woven fabrics are treated by methods such as tie-dyeing, resist dyeing and direct application. The dupatta worn by women show the popularity of dyeing. In 2008, traditional Jodhpur garments inspired designer Raghavendra Rathore's collection, Rathore Jodhpur. Fabric dyeing belongs to the Chippa caste of Rajasthan. Fabrics are embellished with mirror embroidery, symbolic to Rajasthan and wooden beading once dyed. The trend of mirror embroidery is also visible on dupattas in Punjab, known as the phulkari. Decorative patterns adorn all surfaces in Rajasthan. Interiors of homes are painted with floral motifs; similar bindi (dotted) designs are seen on garments. The clipped camel is unique to Rajasthan. In this, patterns are imprinted on the hide of the camel, taken place during the Pushkar and Nagaur festivals by the Rabari caste.   Puppetry and theatre has remained a popular form of entertainment in Rajasthan. Recently, its popularity has reduced with increased interest in film and television amongst rural communities. The nat bhat caste produces these marionette style puppets.  Facial expressions are painted on a mango wood head and the body is covered in decorative, Rajasthani clothing. The strings loosely bind the arms and torso together to give flexibility for movement. These puppets usually perform in legends and mythology conveying a moral message. The Rajasthani craft industry is iconic to the identity of India with many of its styles reaching the international market. Tie-dyeing is an example of how international fashion aesthetics have rooted from simple crafts methods of Rajasthan.

Crafts of Gujarat 
Gujarat is renowned for its textile production methods. Bordering Rajasthan, the two states share similarities in culture and identity. The ancient Indus Valley civilization inhabited the entire region, including Rajasthan and Punjab during Medieval India. They embarked on this textile industry in Gujarat. Within textile production, each caste is assigned to an occupation of its own. These are, weaving, dyeing and printing. For example, the Salvi caste is assigned to weaving. Garment producers bring these elements together to form the identity of Gujarati textiles. Direct application is a method also symbolic to Gujarati garments. Paint and other applicants are used to form patterns on fabric for dupattas, ghagras (long skirt) and turbans. Block printing is a widely used form of direct application, Gujarati Ajrakh block printing is one of the oldest printing technique, origin of Ajrakh can probably be older than we can imagine. Excavation sites of Indus Valley Civilization give evidence that Ajrakh was possibly one of the oldest printing methods of the Indian subcontinent. 

In Bandhani, a unique Gujarati craft, fabric is tied at different sections before dyeing to create patterns. This foundation of forming patterns through dyeing has emerged from the rural communities of this state. Along with the complete image of a Gujarati woman are large bangles made of ivory and plastic, these are symbols of a married woman. Conch shell and shellac bangles are the most common. Conch shell bangles are plain white with a light shade of a brighter colour where as shellac bangles are shaped as a shell, painted and decorated with glitter.   These have in recent years become an accessory in both domestic and international markets..

Crafts of Assam 
To the far eastern region of India is Assam. A state recognised for its creative use of raw materials in textiles and crafts. Assam was one of the states whose craftwork was exhibited in the National Handicrafts and Handborn Museum in 2010, showcased to first lady, Michelle Obama. Production of silk fabrics is iconic of Assamese textiles. Silk is the most valued raw material of Assam, with the Antheraea assama worm producing the unique muga silk. It is mostly the duty of women to construct silk fabrics, using a domestic backstrap loom. Mahatma Gandhi had noted ‘Assamese women are born weavers, they weave fairy-tales in their cloth’. Domestic weaving is an important craft for Assamese women, their marriage and future is seen as reliant upon this skill. At some stage, an unmarried girl would present a hand made bihuan to her beloved. Weaving holds a significant moral and cultural value in Assam. The silk and textile industry is also an economic resource to the state with over 25000 families associated with this craft. Cane and bamboo crafts are also unique to Assam, the result of heavy physical work. Ridang, suli, lezai and long cane are a natural resource to the state. The finest cane is chopped and reduced to thin strips then woven into sheets. It is attached to the frame of a furniture piece, usually made out of bamboo sticks. They are also used as mats, providing comfort in summer. The trend of this sitalpati mat is also seen in Punjab in which a woven mat attached to a frame becomes a charpai. The crafts of Assam are reliant upon the raw materials of the state also making them unique.

Crafts of South India 
The diversity of religious beliefs has had a great impact on the crafts of Southern India. The region has seen the rule of various empires such as the Mughal, Portuguese, Dutch, French and British.  Each has left their mark of style on traditional crafts. The craft industry of South India has established itself commercially in the nation, whilst reflecting a long history of foreign rule. Dravidian style, stone carved temples reflect the influence of Hinduism whilst Roman Catholic churches echo the impact of the British rule. Temple carvings are symbolic of the craft skills in the Tamil Nadu region. The Meenakshi temple of Madurai typifies the skills and devotion put into this craftwork.

Madurai garland making craft can be defined as a band or chain of flowers, foliage, and leaves. In Tamil Nadu, and particularly in the temple town of Madurai, flower garlands are considered to play a significant role in expressing and enhancing Tamil culture. Every garland is a myriad of colours; a kaleidoscopic journey; an array of fragrant, vivid flowers weaved together to symbolize love, purity, and devotion.

 Each section of the temple is a sacred shrine to a deity. North of Tamil Nadu is Karnataka, a region renowned for its wood and stone craftwork. The forests of this region provide extensive supplies of raw materials, mostly rosewood. For wood workers, crafting statues for large temples is a major source of income. The forms of characters from Hindu mythology are carefully shaped with a chisel. Soapstone is also commonly used to carve statues giving them a unique textural quality and smooth finish.

Crafts today 
The crafts of India have been valued throughout time; their existence today proves the efforts put into their preservation. Contemporary designers such as Ritu Kumar and Ritu Virani are constantly embedding traditional crafts into their designs.  Also, there is a complete educational institute, Indian Institute of Crafts and Design (IICD) which is established in Jaipur, Rajasthan, which mainly educates for the crafts and their existence with design. Despite these efforts, the roots of these crafts, which are the rural craftsmen, are in decline. This argued by the India Foundation for the Arts organisation. Rising costs of materials and supplies have placed many of these craft communities in financial struggle. A recent article in the Times of India predicts the price of steel to rise between Rs 600 and 1000 per tonne. On the other hand, statistics from the All India Handicrafts Board show that craft export has risen from 230 million to over 90 billion since the past 50 years. With rising economic and political issues in India, the craft sector is struggling to uphold. Although an interest to retain the culture of crafts is seen in designers and institutions.
Handicrafts are the creative products made by the skill of the hand without the help of modern machinery and equipment. Nowadays, hand-made products are considered to be a fashion statement and an item of luxury.

India's rich cultural heritage and centuries of evolutionary tradition is manifested by the huge variety of handicrafts made all over the country. Handicrafts are a mirror of the cultural identity of the ethnic people who make it. Through the ages, handicrafts made in India like the Kashmiri woollen carpets, Zari embroidered fabrics, terracotta and ceramic products, silk fabrics etc. have maintained their exclusiveness. In the ancient times, these handicrafts were exported to far off countries of Europe, Africa, West Asia and Far East via the ‘silk route’. The entire wealth of timeless Indian handicrafts has survived through the ages. These crafts carry the magnetic appeal of the Indian culture that promises exclusivity, beauty, dignity and style.

References

External links

Manjusha Art
Handcraft Tradition Of India
Handicrafts of India
 Dhokra Art | A rare Bronze Age craft | Bastar Art & Handicraft | The Tribal Hermit

India
Indian culture